Aeromonas popoffii is a Gram-negative bacterium of the genus Aeromonas isolated from drinking water production plants and reservoirs in Oelegem, Belgium, and in Scotland.

References

Further reading

External links
Type strain of Aeromonas popoffii at BacDive -  the Bacterial Diversity Metadatabase

Aeromonadales
Bacteria described in 1997